Cabela's Big Game Hunter is the first video game in the Big Game Hunter series.  It portrays a variety of hunting scenarios and has a variety of weapons, characters, animals, and locations.

The game was published by HeadGames Publishing, in conjunction with hunting supply company Cabela's.

Reception
Computer Gaming World gave the game a score of one-and-a-half stars out of five, saying that it "suffers from a split personality: 50 percent of the game is decent; 50 percent of it is utter crap. [...] If Head Games could find a workable hunt engine to pair with the pre-hunt preparations, they’d improve the game all the way to mediocre.  As it stands, it’s not worth your money."

The game sold 250,000 copies.

Expansion pack
Special Permit is an expansion pack created for the original game. It released in 1998, featuring new animals, 23 new stands, a new world, 9 new weapons, new camps, a new target range and an all-new video.

References

External links

1998 video games
Cabela's video games
Windows games
Windows-only games
Hunting video games
Video games developed in the United States